The following is an incomplete list of festivals in Virginia.

Festivals

 Anime Mid-Atlantic
 Castleton Festival
 Celebrate Fairfax!
  Celebrate Literacy and Arts in the Park (April 23rd in Orange, VA)
 The Daffodil Festival
 Highland County Maple Festival
 International Children's Festival at Wolf Trap
 Nekocon
 Neptune Festival
 RavenCon
 Shenandoah Apple Blossom Festival 
 Tephra Fine Arts Festival 
 Upperville Colt & Horse Show
 Virginia Arts Festival
 DJ Skyhigh End Of Summer Blast

Film
 Redemptive Film Festival
 The Spooky Movie Film Festival
 VCU French Film Festival
 Virginia Film Festival

Music
 All Good Music Festival
 Bristol Rhythm & Roots Reunion
 Buskerfest
 FloydFest
 Hampton Jazz Festival
 Lockn' Festival
 Shenandoah Valley Music Festival

Food

References

Food and drink festivals in the United States

Festivals
Lists of festivals in the United States by state or region
Food festivals in Virginia
Lists of festivals in North America by region